= Flea World =

Coordinates: 28.743264°N 81.2951606°W

Flea World was a flea market located in Sanford, Florida. It was opened in 1981 by Orlando businessman Syd Levy. Billed as "the nation's largest flea market under one roof", Flea World included more than 1,700 vendors on a 104-acre site. It was open on Fridays, Saturdays, and Sundays. The Orlando Sentinel described it as "a poor man's mall with vendors selling everything from tools, toys and bamboo butterfly nets to legal advice, fortune telling and eyebrow waxing." Levy claimed that at one time, Flea World had more than three million visitors per year.

Fun World, an amusement park located adjacent to Flea World, was opened in 1990. The $5 million attraction featured a go-cart track, bumper cars, and carnival rides.

In November 2014, Syd Levy announced plans to close Flea World and redevelop the site. At the time, he stated he intended to keep the flea market open until at least January 2016. In July 2015, it was reported that "development plans have been accelerated" and that Flea World would be closing on August 30. Levy said that an exodus of dealers following the announcement of Flea World's impending shutdown had made it "a losing proposition" to continue to run the market. Flea World will be replaced with a mixed-use development called Reagan Center, incorporating apartments, townhomes, office space, and retail space.

On May 12, 2016, Demolition started at Flea World, in conjunction with the widening of US 17/92.
